The Monterrey Mexico Temple is the 110th operating temple of the Church of Jesus Christ of Latter-day Saints (LDS Church).

The Monterrey Mexico Temple was the 12th LDS temple to be built in Mexico. It serves over 91,000 members in the city of Monterrey and the northeast of the country in general. Prior to the construction of the temple, members had to travel as long as 25 hours and cross the U.S.–Mexico border to attend Spanish-speaking sessions at the church's Mesa Arizona Temple.

History
Due to local resistance to the original site chosen for the temple, ground was not broken for five years following the announcement of the temple. Although the church won a three-year legal suit, officials decided to relocate the temple site to appease neighbors of the original site. The new temple site is located in the Huajuco zone of Monterrey along the National Highway. Construction on the temple began on November 4, 2000.

A two-week open house prior to the dedication of the temple attracted about 40,000 people. Among the attendees were business, government, civic leaders, and officials from other religious faiths. On April 28, 2002, LDS Church president Gordon B. Hinckley dedicated the Monterrey Mexico Temple, the 75th temple he had dedicated.

The Monterrey Mexico Temple has a classic modern design with a single-spire. The exterior is finished with white granite.

In 2020, the Monterrey Mexico Temple was closed in response to the coronavirus pandemic.

See also

 Horacio A. Tenorio, former temple president
 Comparison of temples of The Church of Jesus Christ of Latter-day Saints
 List of temples of The Church of Jesus Christ of Latter-day Saints
 List of temples of The Church of Jesus Christ of Latter-day Saints by geographic region
 Temple architecture (Latter-day Saints)
 The Church of Jesus Christ of Latter-day Saints in Mexico

References

External links
 Official Monterrey Mexico Temple page
 Monterrey Mexico Temple at ChurchofJesusChristTemples.org

21st-century Latter Day Saint temples
Buildings and structures in Monterrey
Temples (LDS Church) completed in 2002
Temples (LDS Church) in Mexico
2002 establishments in Mexico